The 1990 Detroit Drive season was the third season for the Drive. They finished 6–2 and won ArenaBowl IV.

Regular season

Schedule

Standings

y – clinched regular-season title

x – clinched playoff spot

Playoffs

Roster

Awards

Detroit Drive Season, 1990
Detroit Red Wings
Massachusetts Marauders
ArenaBowl champion seasons